= Songer Butte =

Mountain in Oregon, United States

Coordinates: 42°08′42″N 122°36′23″W

Songer Butte is a summit in the U.S. state of Oregon. The elevation is 2,736 feet (834 m).

Songer Butte was named after one William F. Songer.
